Saint Amatus, also called St. Aimé or Aimé of Sion, was a Benedictine monk.

Life
Born of a wealthy family, Aimé took the monastic habit at the Abbey of St. Maurice, Agaunum, where with the leave of the abbot, he dwelt in a little cell cut in a rock, with an oratory adjoining, which is now called our Lady's in the rock.

About the year 669, after serving as abbot Amatus was chosen bishop of Sion, in the Valais. He was an accomplished pastor, and here he was abled to distribute alms more plentifully among the poor. He had governed his diocese almost five years, when certain calumnies were spread about him. It was said that he had spoken negatively concerning the Mayor of the Palace, Ebroin. Despite the fact that no synod had been assembled to hear him, no sentence of deposition issued out, nor had he been charged with any crime, King Theuderic III banished him to Saint Fursey’s monastery at Péronne, where Ultan, the abbot, received him with all respect. Relieved of the responsibility of managing a diocese, Bishop Aimé found tranquility in exile.

After the death of Ultan, Abbot Mauront was charged with the custody of the bishop, and took him first to the monastery of Hamaye; but soon after built a new abbey upon an estate of his own, at a place called Breüil in Flanders. Aimé removed with him to Breüil. Mauront welcomed him as a guest, and delegated to him the government of that abbey. Aimé, having settled the house in excellent order, shut himself up in a little cell near the church. Thus he lived five years with these monks, and died in 690.
Some time before his death in 691, Theuderic came to regret his treatment of Aimé, and in satisfaction made several donations to the abbey of Breüil.   

Around 700 Saint Bain translated the body of St. Amatus from Merville to the church which St. Maurout had built at Douay.

Saint Aimé is commemorated on September 13.

Other uses

Places, presumably named after the Saint 
 Saint-Aimé, the colonial name of Djidioua (Algeria) in French

See also 
 Saint Ame, of Grenoble, a Benedictine abbot and hermit who is also called Saint Amatus and has the same memorial day.
 Saint-Amé, a commune in the Vosges department in Lorraine in northeastern France.

References

690 deaths
7th-century Frankish saints
Benedictine saints
Swiss Benedictines
Year of birth unknown